Rahim Muhamedovich Kurbanmamedov  (born 3 October 1963) is a Turkmen football coach. He is currently a head coach of FC Merw.

Career

Playing career 
He played for Kopetdag Asgabat, Nisa Aşgabat and Turkmenistan national football team from 1992 to 1998

Coaching career 
He has been coach of Turkmenistan national football team from 2003 to 2008. He coached Nisa Aşgabat in 2003–2004, Navbahor Namangan in 2009 and Merw Mary from 2009. In 2013, he went to FC Balkan, with which he won the AFC President's Cup 2013 in Malaysia.

In 2014, he was re-appointed head coach of Turkmenistan national football team. In June 2014 for poor team play in the final tournament of the AFC Challenge Cup, which resulted in the Turkmenistan footballers were unable to leave the group, was relieved of his post.

In November 2021, Kurbanmämmedow  was appointed manager of Ýokary Liga club FC Merw.

Achievements 
Runner Up 1993 ECO Cup as player of Turkmenistan national football team
Qualification for 2004 AFC Asian Cup as coach of Turkmenistan national football team
Champion of 2008 HCMC Cup in Vietnam as coach of Turkmenistan national football team
 AFC President's Cup: 2013

References 

1963 births
Living people
Sportspeople from Ashgabat
Turkmenistan football managers
Turkmenistan footballers
Turkmenistan international footballers
Turkmenistan national football team managers
FK Köpetdag Aşgabat players
FC Nisa Aşgabat players
FC Nisa Aşgabat managers
Association football defenders
Soviet footballers
Footballers at the 1994 Asian Games
Asian Games competitors for Turkmenistan